Delta Epsilon Psi is a South Asian interest social and service fraternity located in the United States. The 18 founders formed the fraternity to provide a unified South Asian voice at the school.

The purpose of Delta Epsilon Psi is to develop leadership qualities within its members by instilling within them the three pillars (Brotherhood, Discipline, and Commitment) upon which the fraternity was founded.

Founding fathers 
Delta Epsilon Psi's founding fathers are:

Philanthropy
Delta Epsilon Psi's  philanthropies are research towards curing juvenile diabetes (type 1 diabetes) through the Juvenile Diabetes Research Foundation (JDRF), and supporting the National Marrow Donor Program.

North American Interfraternity Conference
In , Delta Epsilon Psi officially became nationally recognized by the North American Interfraternity Conference (NIC).

Chapters and colonies

Delta Epsilon Psi's website lists 31 chapters and colonies.

Chapters

Colonies

For several colonies, no location is given on the fraternity's website. These colonies may not be affiliated with a school, the affiliation may be in process or have been revoked, or the website may not have been updated:

Omicron Colony
Phi Colony
Chi Colony
Alpha Zeta Colony

See also
List of social fraternities and sororities

References

Asian-American culture in Austin, Texas
Asian-American fraternities and sororities
Fraternities and sororities in the United States
Indian-American culture in Texas
Student organizations established in 1998
South Asian American culture
University of Texas at Austin
Active former members of the North American Interfraternity Conference
1998 establishments in Texas